Chatterton is the ninth studio album by French rocker Alain Bashung, issued in 1994 on Barclay Records.

Production 
The music melt the use of pedal steel guitar with synths, for instance on "J'passe pour une caravane" ("They mistake me for a caravan"), and the style was dubbed "country new age" by Bashung himself. The most well-known track on the album in France is "Ma petite entreprise" ("My little business") which was popularized when it was used as the theme song to the movie My Little Business by Pierre Jolivet in 1999.

Reception

Critical reception 
In 2010, the French edition of Rolling Stone magazine named this album the 40th greatest French rock album (out of 100).

Track listing

Personnel

Musicians 
 Alain Bashung - vocals, guitars (11)
 Michael Brook - guitar (1 through 9, 11, 12), drums (5), percussions (5)
 Eddie Martinez - guitar (1, 3, 4, 7 through 10, 12)
 Pierre Van Dormael - guitar (1), acoustic guitar (5, 7, 11)
 Nicolas Fiszman - bass guitar (1 à 5, 7, 9 through 11), bass bow (1), acoustic guitar (2), guitar (3, 4)
 Stéphane Belmondo - trumpet (1, 7, 11, 12)
 Marc Ribot - guitar (2, 3, 4, 6, 7, 11)
 Link Wray - guitar (2, 6, 8, 9)
 Jean-Marc Lederman - keyboards (2, 4, 5, 6, 10), drums (2, 6), percussion (2, 6)
 Jean-Pierre Pilot - drums (2, 7, 11, 12), percussion (2, 7, 11, 12)
 Sonny Landreth - guitar (5), slide guitar (3, 8, 10)
 Dony Wynn - percussion (3, 4, 10), drums (4, 8, 9)
 Ally McErlaine - guitars (4, 7 through 10)
 Jean Fauque - drums (4, 11, 12), percussion (4, 11, 12), keyboards (4, 12)

Production 
 Alain Bashung: production
 Djoum: recording, mixing (4, 12), production
 Phil Delire: recording (1 à 11), mixing (1 à 3, 5 à 11), production
 Michel Diericks: recording (3, 4, 6, 7, 11, 12)
 Marc Thonon: executive production
 Jean-Baptiste Mondino: photos
 Huart / Cholley: graphism

References 

1994 albums
Barclay (record label) albums
Alain Bashung albums